is a Japanese former volleyball player who competed in the 1964 Summer Olympics.

In 1964 he was a squad member of the Japanese team which won the bronze medal in the Olympic tournament.

External links
 Olympic report 1964
 International Olympic Committee medal database

1941 births
Living people
Japanese men's volleyball players
Olympic volleyball players of Japan
Volleyball players at the 1964 Summer Olympics
Olympic bronze medalists for Japan
Olympic medalists in volleyball
Medalists at the 1964 Summer Olympics